Boubyan Bank is an Islamic Bank in Kuwait established in 2004. Boubyan Bank has a paid up capital exceeding 196.5 million Kuwaitis Dinars (equivalent to approximately 700 million US Dollars).
Boubyan Bank is one of the emerging banks in Kuwait and GCC, benefiting from its relation with National Bank of Kuwait, the major shareholder, which is ranked among the largest 300 banks worldwide.
Boubyan Bank provides a variety of banking services to individuals, private, business and corporate customers. The main activities of Boubyan Bank includes accepting deposits, establishing investment funds, and trading in real estate. The Bank deals with all types of Islamic transactions, including: 
	Mudaraba
	Investment agency agreement
	Murabaha
	Lease

Boubyan Bank Subsidiaries 
Subsidiaries and Associates: 
Boubyan Group includes the following subsidies and associates by end of 2013:
	Boubyan Takaful 			– Kuwait (with ownership of 67.63%)
	Boubyan Capital 			– Kuwait  (with ownership of 99.55%)
	Saudi Projects Holding Group		– Kuwait  (with ownership of 25%)
	Bank of London and the Middle East (BLME) 	– UK  (with ownership of 25.62%)
	Bank Syariah Muamalat Indonesia	– Indonesia (with ownership of 22%)
	Ijarah Indonesia Finance Company	– Indonesia (with ownership of 33.33%)
	United Capital Bank			– Sudan (with ownership of 21.67%)

Board of Directors

Executive Management

Shariah Committee 
Shariah Committee: 
Boubyan Bank has a Shariah Committee which monitors and approves its activities and transactions, and comprises:

External links
https://boubyan.bankboubyan.com/en/

References

Banks of Kuwait
Banks established in 2004
Kuwaiti companies established in 2004
Companies listed on the Boursa Kuwait